Marvel Strike Force is a turn-based role-playing mobile game by FoxNext (later acquired by Scopely) for Android, iOS, and iPadOS platforms. The game was launched worldwide on March 28, 2018, and is primarily set in the Marvel Universe.

Premise
The Earth has fallen under siege by sinister forces led by Ultimus. Agents of S.T.R.I.K.E. (Special Tactical Reserve for Interdimensional Key Events) have been called to assemble squads of heroes and villains to combat Ultimus's legions, that includes mind-controlled versions of the heroes and villains (existing in alternate universes), before Earth falls under Ultimus' control.

In addition to this campaign, special sub-plot events are also released, loosely based on recent Marvel films that have been released, starting with Avengers: Infinity War.

Gameplay 
Marvel Strike Force allows players to collect Marvel Universe characters from both the heroes and villains and generic characters from large organizations such as S.H.I.E.L.D., The Hand and Hydra, and use them to fight in turn-based battles. Similar to the fighting game Marvel: Contest of Champions, characters fall into one of several classes.  There are multiple ways to collect characters: some are given to players immediately, whereas others are gained via gameplay or as in-game rewards in the form of shards that are earned by players to unlock and or promote their characters. Shards can either be earned from winning battles or bought from a shop. Players level up their user level by gaining experience by completing daily quests or completing battles.

Battles are divided up into rounds, with the character with the highest speed attribute going first. Each team consists of up to five characters (though some AI teams in raids can have far more characters than that) who battle until defeated or reinforcements enter. Battles are turn-based, based on the speed attribute, where the combatants apply healing and various buffs to their own team and damage and debuffs to the opponent all the while trying to deal the most overall damage and having the last character alive.

Players may join alliances that form the main group inside of the game, which can include up to 24 players and be private or open. Alliances allow players to play in raids and wars and to access alliance milestones. These alliances can be created by any player or created by the game. All players must be in an alliance, so if a player leaves or is kicked from an alliance, the game will assign a new one.

Characters usually appear in their attire from the existing comics; a costume currency is available for purchasing attire for certain characters based on their Marvel Cinematic Universe appearances, old comic appearances or other notable media appearances. The attire sets have no bearing on the characters' moves, it's there for added color.

Modes 
The main game modes are Arena, Blitz, Raids, Alliance War, Real Time Arena, Cosmic Crucible, Alliance War, Campaign, Challenges, Dark Dimension, Scourges, and Sagas. The first four of those have their own currencies that can be spent on character shards or items. All modes are played versus a computer-controlled AI, except Real Time Arena where you play against other players; this includes the Arena, Blitz, Cosmic Crucible, and Alliance War battles in which the AI controls a player-created team.

Campaigns are story modes with pre-match dialogues. They are divided into Worlds and these Worlds are divided into Stages. Each Stage features playable squads composed of characters selected by the players (up to 5), characters assigned by the story mode, or a combination of both. The AI sets the opponents for each Stage, generally in three ways:
The usual way: kill all enemies in the opposing side to win.
Specific way: kill specific enemies to win the match or prevent the deployment of machinery.
Operator way: player's operator(s) must survive to accomplish a goal, such as deploying machinery.
All the player's selected characters must survive in order to earn all three stars available for the Stage, which will enable Auto-Win for that Stage, which allows the player to earn resources for that Stage without going through a full battle. Enemy squad members will generally have glowing red eyes, indicating their control by Ultimus.

Arena pits player-created squads against other player-created squads in 5-on-5 battles while competing for daily prizes based on ranking at the end of the daily reset time.
Blitz works the same way as the Arena but the opposing squads are generally of lower levels, giving a higher handicap advantage to the player. Unlike the Arena, which sets a time gap before another match can take place, Blitz allows immediate subsequent matches (though if the same characters are used, Blitz energy units are consumed, 5 per character).
Raids are a series of maps that a player-ran alliance of up to 24 people must work together to defeat all of the nodes.
Challenges are completed once a day to allow players to accumulate various resources. Each challenge occurs three days per week and can be completed three times per day. Challenge requires specific character traits to be used to complete each tier of the challenge.
Alliance War is working together within a player's alliance to defeat an opponent's helicarrier with 12 rooms each with two sets of 10 defense teams while defending with the player's own helicarrier.
Real Time Arena is a one versus one battle between two players played in real-time.

Bio Characters

Marvel characters who are naturally enhanced or they have become biologically enhanced (due to natural events or experimental purposes) will fall under the "Bio" category.
A.I.M. Infector
A.I.M. Monstrosity
Abomination
Agent Venom
Anti-Venom
Black Bolt
Brawn
Captain America
Captain Carter
Captain Marvel
Carnage
Crystal
Cull Obsidian
Daredevil
Drax
Electro
Ghost-Spider
Graviton
Green Goblin
Groot
Hulk
Human Torch
Invisible Woman
Jessica Jones
Kree Noble
Kree Reaper
Kree Royal Guard
Luke Cage
Mantis
Mister Fantastic
Ms. Marvel
Phyla-Vell
Quake
Ravager Bruiser
Red Hulk
Red Skull
Rhino
Scarlet Spider
Scream
She-Hulk
Spider-Man
Spider-Man (Miles)
Spider-Man (Symbiote)
Spider-Punk
Spider-Woman
Squirrel Girl
Stature
Swarm
The Thing
Titania
U.S. Agent
Venom
Winter Soldier
Yo-Yo

Mutant Characters

Marvel characters who carry the "X" gene mutation will fall under the "Mutant" category.

 Apocalypse
 Archangel
 Beast
 Bishop
 Blob
 Cable
 Colossus
 Cyclops
 Dark Beast
 Dazzler
 Deadpool
 Domino
 Emma Frost
 Fantomex
 Gambit 
 Iceman
 Jubilee
 Kitty Pryde
 Longshot
 Madelyne Pryor
 Magik
 Magneto
 Mister Sinister
 Multiple Man
 Mystique
 Namor
 Negasonic
 Nemesis
 Omega Red
 Phoenix
 Polaris
 Psylocke
 Pyro
 Quicksilver 
 Rogue
 Sabretooth
 Shatterstar
 Silver Samurai
 Storm
 Stryfe
 Sunfire
 Toad
 Wolverine
 X-23

Mystic Characters

Marvel characters who practice the mystical arts and/or are considered mystical beings will fall under the "Mystic" category. 
Absorbing Man
Adam Warlock
Agatha Harkness
America Chavez
Black Panther
Black Panther (1MM)
Cloak
Dagger
Deathpool
Doctor Strange
Doctor Voodoo
Dormammu
Ebony Maw
Elektra
Elsa Bloodstone
Ghost Rider
Hand Assassin
Hand Sentry
Hand Sorceress
Heimdall
Hela
Ikaris
Iron Fist
Juggernaut
Loki
M’Baku
Mighty Thor (Jane Foster)
Mister Negative
Moon Knight
Morbius 
Mordo
Morgan Le Fay
Nico Minoru
Nobu
Ronan The Accuser
Scarlet Witch
Sersi
Silver Surfer
Spider-Man (Noir)
Spider-Weaver
Strange (Heartless)
Thanos
Thor
Ultimus
White Tiger
Wong
Yondu

Skill Characters

Marvel characters who are professionally trained in hand-to-hand combat and whose origins are related to the alternate traits of mystic, mutant, tech, or bio will fall under the "Skill" category.

 A.I.M. Researcher
 Baron Zemo
 Black Widow
 Bullseye 
 Captain America (Sam)
 Colleen Wing
 Corvus Glaive
 Echo
 Gamora
 Hand Archer
 Hand Blademaster
 Hawkeye
 Hydra Scientist 
 Karnak
 Kestrel
 Killmonger
 Kingpin
 Maria Hill
 Mercenary Riot Guard
 Mercenary Soldier
 Moondragon
 Nick Fury
 Night Nurse
 Okoye
 Proxima Midnight
 Punisher
 Red Guardian
 S.H.I.E.L.D. Assault 
 S.H.I.E.L.D. Medic
 S.H.I.E.L.D. Operative
 S.H.I.E.L.D. Security 
 S.H.I.E.L.D. Trooper
 Shang-Chi
 Sharon Carter
 Sif
 Taskmaster
 Valkyrie
 Yelena Belova

Tech Characters

Marvel characters who are technologically advanced or if the character primarily derives from technology, they will fall under the Tech category.

A.I.M. Assaulter
A.I.M. Security
Agent Coulson
Ant-Man
Crossbones
Deathlok
Doctor Doom
Doctor Octopus
Falcon
Ghost
Hulkbuster
Hydra Armored Guard
Hydra Grenadier
Hydra Rifle Trooper
Hydra Sniper
Iron Man
Ironheart
Kang The Conqueror 
Kate Bishop
Kestrel
Korath the Pursuer
Kree Cyborg
Kree Reaper
Lady Deathstrike
Mercenary Lieutenant
Mercenary Sniper
Minn-Erva
Misty Knight
Mysterio
Nebula
Ravager Boomer
Ravager Stitcher
Rescue
Rocket Raccoon
Scientist Supreme
Shocker
Shuri
Star-Lord
Star-Lord (T’Challa)
Ultron
Vision
Viv Vision
Vulture
War Machine
Wasp
Yellow Jacket

Teams

A-Force
Asgardians
Astonishing X-Men
Avengers
Bionic Avengers
Black Order
Brotherhood of Mutants
Dark Hunters
Darkhold
Death Seed
Fantastic Four
Gamma
Guardians of the Galaxy
Hand
Heroes for Hire
Horsemen
Hydra
Infinity Watch
Inhumans
Kree
Marauders
Masters Of Evil
Mercenaries
Power Armor
Pym Tech
Ravagers
Rebirth
S.H.I.E.L.D.
Secret Avengers
Shadowland
Sinister Six
Symbiotes
Uncanny X-Men
Unlimited X-Men
Wakanda
Weapon X
Web Warriors
X-Factor
X-Force
X-Men
Young Avengers

Reception

Critical
Game Informer criticised the expensive content and numerous bugs, concluding that it "feels designed to frustrate players until they finally cave and spend."

Sales
Marvel Strike Force generated $150 million in sales during its first year of operation (2018) on the iOS and Android platforms.  Growth continued modestly to $180+ million in sales in 2019, but exploded in 2020 with approximately $300 million in revenue.

Awards
The game was nominated for "Mobile Game of the Year" at the SXSW Gaming Awards, and won the People's Voice Award for "Games" in the "Video" category of the 2019 Webby Awards, whereas its other nomination was for "Strategy/Simulation Game" under the "Games" category. Google Play awarded it as the best breakthrough game of 2019, which is for overall design, user experience, engagement and retention, and strong growth. The game was also nominated for "Best Live Ops" at the Pocket Gamer Mobile Games Awards, and for "Strategy/Simulation" at the 2020 Webby Awards.

References

External links

2018 video games
Action role-playing video games
Android (operating system) games
IOS games
Multiplayer and single-player video games
Scopely games
Video games based on Marvel Comics
Video games set in Africa
Video games set in New York City